Alessandro Motti and Stéphane Robert were the defending champions, but did not compete this year.

Antal van der Duim and Boy Westerhof won the title, defeating James Cluskey and Jesse Huta Galung 7–6(7–3), 6–4 in the final.

Seeds

Draw

Draw

References
 Main Draw

Copa Sevilla doubles
Doubles
2014 ATP Challenger Tour